Gotthard Schuh (December 22, 1897 in Schöneberg near Berlin – December 29, 1969 in Küsnacht, Zurich) was a Swiss photographer, painter and graphic artist.

Early life and education
Gotthard Schuh was born in Berlin to Swiss parents, the son of engineer Christian Heinrich Schuh. In 1902 the family moved to Aarau, where he attended elementary school and from 1914 the local high school. In 1916 he graduated from the trade school in Basel. During WW1 from 1917 Schuh was drafted into the border service as a soldier.

Painter
From 1919 he lived as a painter in Basel and Geneva. After a long trip to Italy in 1920, he settled in Munich as a painter. In 1926 he returned to Switzerland and set up a photography business, and in 1927 married Marga Zürcher from St. Gallen with whom he had a son Kaspar (* 1934). He moved to Zurich and from 1928 to 1931 held exhibitions of painting and joined the Basel artist group “Rot-Blau”.

Photographer

In 1931 his first photos were published in a Zurich magazine and in 1932 he held a photography exhibition in Paris, where he met Picasso, Léger and Braque.

From 1932 he joined the Zürcher Illustrierte under Arnold Kübler, working with Hans Staub and Paul Senn, and until 1937 Schuh also worked freelance for Berliner Illustrirte Zeitung, Paris Match and Life. His assignments during 1938/1939 took him all over Europe and to Indonesia.  He and Marga divorced in 1939.

After about ten years as a reporter he became the first picture editor for the Neue Zürcher Zeitung. He and Edwin Arnet created the NZZ supplement Das Wochenende, which showcased Swiss and international photography in addition to his own reportage.

From this period a significant part of his own photographic work illustrated books, of which the most successful was Inseln der Götter published in 1941, the result of his almost 11-month journey through Singapore, Java, Sumatra and Bali, undertaken just before the war. It was a mixture of reportage and self-reflection, with a poetic quality that, though individual images may be read either way, Schuh sometimes valued over documentary authenticity:

This is evident in the book Begegnungen which Schuh published in 1956, in which he combined older and more recent images in free association, in accord with the objectives of the ‘Kollegium Schweizerischer Photographen’, the Academy of Swiss Photographers which he founded together with Paul Senn, Walter Läubli, Werner Bischof and Jakob Tuggener, a loose group that promoted an ‘auteur’ emphasis. Their first exhibition in 1951 marked a renewal of photography in Switzerland after the conservatism and nationalism of the war years. Critic Edwin Arnet identified the ethos of the group: 

In 1955 Edward Steichen selected two of Schuh's photographs for the world-touring Museum of Modern Art exhibition The Family of Man seen by an audience of 9 million. One, taken in Italy, is a stolen image of lovers resting beside their discarded bicycles amongst long summer grass in an olive grove, while the other, taken in Java, shows a boy stretching balletically across the pavement as he plays marbles.

Later life
In 1944 Schuh married Annamarie Custer with whom he had two daughters, Claudia and Sybille. After 1960, he returned to painting.

Gotthard Schuh died in 1969 in Küsnacht on Lake Zurich.  administers the rights to Schuh's images, hosting photographs by Schuh on the online database of Keystone AG, Zurich, for public use.

Exhibitions
 Helmhaus, Zurich, September 2 - October 1, 1967
 Kunsthaus Zurich, June 19 - August 29, 1982
 Museum of Design Basel, February 4 - March 16, 1986
 Swiss Photo Foundation, Winterthur, May 30 - October 11, 2009
 Musee Niépce, Chalon sur Saône, February 27 - May 30, 2010
 Villa dei Cedri, Bellinzona, July 18 - October 31, 2010
 Fundacion Mapfre, Instituto de Cultura Madrid, December 13, 2011 - February 19, 2012
 Artef, Gallery for Art Photography Zurich, September 13, 2012 - November 17, 2012

Publications

Awards
 1957: Venice Gold Medal
 1967: Appointed Cavaliere (Italy)

Bibliography 
 
 Walter Kern: Der Maler Gotthard Schuh In: Architektur und Kunst,  Vol. 18, 1931, S. 17–24
Annamarie Schuh-Custer: Der Photograph Gotthard Schuh In: Aarauer Neujahrsblätter,  Vol. 57, 1983, S. 57–65 

 Gotthard Schuh, Frühe Photographien 1929–1939. Arche, Zürich 1967.
 Ein Zeitbild: 1930–1950; Paul Senn, Hans Staub, Gotthard Schuh, drei Schweizer Photoreporter. Benteli, Bern 1986, .
 Gotthard Schuh, Photographien aus den Jahren 1929–1963. Benteli, Bern 1983.
 Gotthard Schuh, Eine Art Verliebtheit. Peter Pfrunder (Hg.). Steidl, Göttingen 2009, .

References

1897 births
1969 deaths
Swiss photographers
Swiss photojournalists
Swiss painters